Bertmainius is a genus of spiders in the family Migidae. It was first described in 2015 by Mark Harvey, Barbara York Main, Michael Rix and Steven Cooper. , it contains 7 species, all from Western Australia.

Species
Bertmainius comprises the following species:
Bertmainius colonus Harvey, Main, Rix & Cooper, 2015
Bertmainius monachus Harvey, Main, Rix & Cooper, 2015
Bertmainius mysticus Harvey, Main, Rix & Cooper, 2015
Bertmainius opimus Harvey, Main, Rix & Cooper, 2015
Bertmainius pandus Harvey, Main, Rix & Cooper, 2015
Bertmainius tingle (Main, 1991)
Bertmainius tumidus Harvey, Main, Rix & Cooper, 2015

References

Migidae
Mygalomorphae genera
Spiders of Australia